Ocean is a Canadian documentary film, directed by Catherine Martin and released in 2002. Centred on the Océan passenger train from Montreal to Halifax, the film mixes footage from a trip on the train with interviews on the cultural and historical significance of train travel, touching particularly on themes of memory and nostalgia for past times when long-distance travel by rail was much more common than it is in the 21st century.

The film was named to the Toronto International Film Festival's annual year-end Canada's Top Ten list for 2002.

References

External links 
 

2002 films
Canadian documentary films
Films directed by Catherine Martin
Films shot in Quebec
Documentary films about rail transport
French-language Canadian films
2000s Canadian films